Astrocladus euryale, the basket star, or gorgon's head is a brittlestar of the family Gorgonocephalidae found in the coastal waters of South Africa from the west coast of the Cape Peninsula to about Algoa Bay.

Description
The 10 arms branch repeatedly in an alternating pattern into ever-finer tendrils, which can be extended to form a basket-like net for filter feeding, or rolled up compactly against the body disc when not feeding. The body is generally a pale grey studded with whitish knobs usually ringed with black. The pattern varies, and the colours can vary regionally. The arms are usually white to pale grey with black stripes. Disc can be up to about 200mm diameter with extended arms up to 500mm long, Often found on high points of a reef or up on sea fans, noble corals or sponges when feeding. Found on reefs from below about 10m to about 90m.

Originally described as Asterias euryale by A. J. Retzius, in Anmärkningar vid. Asteriae genus. Kungliga Svenska Vetenskapsakademiens handlingar. Volume 4, pages 230-248, (1783)

Gallery

References

Gorgonocephalidae